The grand prix de poésie de la SGDL is a French literary award created by the Société des gens de lettres in 1983 in order to reward an author for the whole of his work. This award is given to the winner during the spring session of the company. It is endowed with a sum of 500 €.

List of laureates 

1983: Bernard Noel
1984: Géo Norge
1985: Rouben Mélik (autumn 84)
1986: Edmond Humeau (autumn 85)
1987: Claude Vigee
1988: Jacques Reda
1989: André Frénaud
1990: Andrée Chedid
1991: Jean-Claude Renard
1992: Pierre Oster
1993: Vénus Khoury-Ghata
1994: Marc Alyn
1995: Jean-Clarence Lambert
1996: Alain Bosquet
1997: Claude Esteban
1998: Philippe Jaccottet
1999: Guy Goffette and Jean Rousselot
2000: Michel Deguy
2001: Lionel Ray
2002: Richard Rognet
2003: Frédéric Jacques Temple
2004: Werner Lambersy
2005: Franck André Jamme
2006: William Cliff
2007: Jean Metellus
2008: Abdelkebir Khatibi, Poésie de l'aimance (La Différence)
2009: Jean Orizet, Le Regard et l'énigme, œuvre poétique 1958-2008 (Le Cherche-Midi)
2010: Philippe Delaveau, Le Veilleur amoureux, (Gallimard)
2011: Max Pons, Vers le silence (La Barbacane)
2012: Charles Dobzynski, La Mort à vif (L'Amourier), Je est un juif, roman (Orizons)
2013: Patrick Laupin, Œuvres poétiques, 2 volumes (Éditions La Rumeur libre)
2014: Robert Nedelec, Quatre-vingts entames en nu (Éditions Jacques Brémond)
2015: Paul Farellier, L'Entretien devant la nuit, Poèmes 1968-2013 (Les Hommes sans Épaules éditions)
2016: Michel Butor, Ruines d'Avenir, un livre tapisserie (Actes Sud/Ville d'Angers)

External links 
 Grand Prix de Poésie de la SGDL
 Palmarès des Grands prix 2016 de la SGDL
 Michel Butor, Lauréat du Grand Prix SGDL de poésie pour l'ensemble de son œuvre on Actes Sud
 Haïti – Littérature : René Depestre, Lauréat du Grand Prix SGDL 2016 on Haïti littérature

French poetry awards
Awards established in 1983